Kamilla and Kamila are feminine given names. Notable people with these names include:

Kamila 

 Kamila Aliyeva (born 1967), Azerbaijani politician
 Kamila Gasiuk-Pihowicz (born 1983), Polish politician
 Kamila Valieva (born 2006), Russian figure skater

Kamilla 
Kamilla Asylova (born 1998), Kazakhstani model, Miss Universe Kazakhstan 2016
Kamilla Farhad (born 1996), Azerbaijani tennis player
Kamilla Gafurzianova (born 1988), Russian female fencer
Kamilla Gainetdinova (born 1997), Russian pair skater
Kamilla Hollai (1899–1967), Hungarian film actress of the silent era
Kamilla Rytter Juhl (born 1983), Danish international elite badminton player
Kamilla Kosztolányi (born 1956), Hungarian rower
Kamilla Kristensen (born 1983), Danish team handball player
Kamilla Seidler (born 1983), Danish chef, head chef at restaurant Gustu in La Paz, Bolivia
Kamilla Składanowska (1948–2010), Polish fencer
Kamilla Trever (1892–1974), Russian historian and orientalist, member of the Russian Academy of Sciences
Kamilla Sofie Vallin (born 1993), Danish professional racing cyclist

See also
Camilla (disambiguation)
Kamil
Kamilla and the Thief (Kamilla og Tyven), Norwegian family movie from 1988
Kamilla and the Thief II (Kamilla og Tyven II), Norwegian family movie from 1989

Feminine given names